Spiraea splendens is a shrub of the rose family (Rosaceae) native to the western mountains of North America, from California to British Columbia, commonly known as dense-flowered spiraea, rose meadowsweet, rosy spiraea, subalpine spiraea, and mountain spiraea. It is commonly found at elevations between 2,000 and 11,000 feet on inland mountain ranges. The plant is adapted to cold, moist, rocky slopes, subalpine forests and meadows.

It is a woody shrub rarely reaching a meter in height. It has light green toothed leaves which turn yellow as cold weather approaches. The plant bears fragrant, fuzzy pom-poms of bright rosy pink flowers in the summer. The fruit is a tiny dry pod, no more than one eighth of an inch in length.

Native Americans made a tea-like drink from the leaves.

References

External links
Jepson Manual Treatment
Washington Burke Museum
Photo gallery

splendens
Flora of California
Flora of Oregon
Flora of Washington (state)
Flora of British Columbia
Flora of Alberta
Flora without expected TNC conservation status